The Ditchley Foundation is a foundation that holds conferences, with a primary focus on British-American relations. It is based at Ditchley Park near Chipping Norton, Oxfordshire. It was established as a privately funded charity in 1958 by philanthropist Sir David Wills.

Notable members
 The Rt Hon. Lord Hill of Oareford, . Current chairman of Ditchley (2017- ). He also has roles as senior advisor, Freshfields Bruckhaus Deringer (2017-); independent national director, Times Newspapers; and board member, Centre for Policy Studies. He was formerly European Commissioner for Financial Stability, Financial Services and Capital Markets Union (2014–16); Leader of the House of Lords and Chancellor of the Duchy of Lancaster (2013–14); Undersecretary of State for Schools (2010-2013). 
 The Rt Hon. Lord Robertson of Port Ellen, .  He is also deputy-chairman of TNK-BP.  He was NATO Secretary General from 1999 to 2003 and UK Defence Secretary from 1997 to 1999, chairman of the Ditchley Foundation, 2010–2017.
 The Rt Hon. Sir John Major, the former British prime minister, chairman of the Ditchley Foundation 2000–2009. 
 Sir John Wheeler-Bennett, . British historian; the first chairman, appointed in 1958.
 Sir Reginald Hibbert, . Director 1982–1987.
 Sir Philip Adams, . Director 1977–1982.
 Sir Michael Quinlan, . Director 1992–1999.
 Sir Nigel Broomfield, . Director 1999–2004.
 Sir Jeremy Greenstock, . Director 2004–2010.
 Sir John Holmes, . Director 2010–2016.

Council of Management
The Rt Hon. Lord Aldington. Chairman, Machfast Group Ltd
The Rt Hon. Lord Bridges of Headley, . Senior Adviser to the Group Executive Chairman, Banco Santander
Her Excellency Mrs Janice Charette. Canadian High Commissioner to the United Kingdom of Great Britain and Northern Ireland
Mrs Marjorie Neasham Glasgow, . CEO, Ridge Clean Energy. President, The Glasgow Foundation.
Mr Charles Grant, . Director, Centre for European Reform
The Rt Hon. Dominic Grieve, . Formerly Member of Parliament for Beaconsfield (1997-2019); Attorney General
The Rt Hon. Lord Hill of Oareford, . Chairman of The Ditchley Foundation
Ms Rachel Lomax. Deputy Chair, British Council
The Rt Hon. Lord Mandelson, . Chairman, Global Counsel. Formerly Secretary of State for Business, Innovation and Skills and European Trade Commissioner
Mr Paul Newman. Former Chairman, ICAP Energy; Director, JC Rathbone Associates Ltd.
Mrs Elizabeth Padmore. Emeritus Trustee, Women for Women International - UK
Ms Emma Reynolds. Formerly Member of Parliament for Wolverhampton North East (2010-2019)
The Most Hon. Marquess of Salisbury, . Chancellor of the University of Hertfordshire
Sir Nigel Sheinwald, . Visiting Professor, King's College, London; Director, Royal Dutch Shell
Mr Philip Stephens. Director of the Editorial Board and Chief Political Commentator, Financial Times
Dr Catherine Wills. Trustee

References

 Our Good Conference Guide: Magic mountains for the mind - ''The Economist - 26 December 1987 - Volume 305

External links

The Ditchley foundation council
The Ditchley foundation governors
The Ditchley Foundation from the autobiography of Harry Hodson
Knives are out for Mandelson as new job begins Enron - Mandelson discussions at Ditchley

Organisations based in Oxfordshire
Political and economic think tanks based in the United Kingdom
Foreign policy and strategy think tanks
Political and economic research foundations
Think tanks established in 1958